Zetland is a Danish media company founded in 2012. Headquartered in Copenhagen, it publishes three to four news articles daily, focusing on long-form stories and in-depth articles. A subscription-based organization, it had more than 18,000 subscribers as of November 2020.

Founded in 2012, Zetland originally created single long-form stories, called e-singles, delivered monthly to subscribers. Journalists would also read their works at public events, similar to Pop-Up Magazine in the U.S., which have become central to Zetland's business model. The company name derives from a hybrid between a zebra and Shetland pony. In 2015, Zetland initiated a relaunch with a crowd-funding campaign which raised over 530,000 kroner (kr.), and additional investments of 8 million kr. The relaunch occurred in March 2016, with Zetland offering daily news articles. In 2016, revenue was 6.2 million kr. In 2018 Zetland is to receive 1.8 million kr. for editorial production services from the Danish cultural board .

Since the relaunch, notable pieces have included conversations with Justice Minister Søren Pind and British sociologist Anthony Giddens. In 2017 Zetland won a trio of awards from the Society for News Design Scandinavias, including gold and "Best of Show" in the digital news category for front page, and silver in the website category.

Zetland has been offering its stories in audio format as well as text, and that has rapidly become the most popular aspect of the site, with 60% of members now consuming their content in audio. In 2021, it switched from MP3 to Opus for its articles' audio recordings, which attained a 35 percent reduction in bandwidth and reduced climate footprint.

Korsgaard attributes the growth of the title to its focus on a membership model as a community, and a constrained number of stories per day, making the site "finish-able" each day.

Zetland achieved financial stability in 2020, with the help of a member-get-member campaign in 2019 that contributed to a 25 percent growth in the span of a month. The campaign was later awarded several awards, including Best Idea to Grow Digital Readership or Engagement from INMA Global Media Awards and Best Digital Marketing Campaign for a News Brand from WAN-IFRA European Digital Media Awards.

In May 2020, former Head of Product Tav Klitgaard replaced co-founder Jakob Moll as CEO, with the latter pursuing academic studies abroad.

References

External links
 (in Danish)
About Zetland (in English)

Mass media companies based in Copenhagen
2012 establishments in Denmark
Danish news websites
Danish-language websites
Internet properties established in 2012